The Portrait of Bartolomeo Panciatichi is a painting by the Italian artist Agnolo di Cosimo, known as Bronzino, finished around 1540. It is housed in the Uffizi Gallery of Florence, Italy since 1704.

Bartolomeo Panciatichi was a Florentine humanist and politician. His wife was also portrayed by Bronzino a few years later.

See also

Portrait of Lucrezia Panciatichi

Notes

References

Panciatichi, Bartolomeo
Panciatichi, Bartolomeo
1540 paintings
Panciatichi, Bartolomeo
Panciatichi, Bartolomeo
Panciatichi, Bartolomeo
Paintings by Bronzino in the Uffizi